Clarence Melvin Smyres (May 24, 1922 in Culver City, California – November 27, 2007 in Lancaster, California) was a Major League Baseball player.

Biography
Smyres was signed by the Brooklyn Dodgers in 1944 after an injury to shortstop-manager Leo Durocher.

Smyres appeared in five games for the Brooklyn Dodgers during the 1944 Major League Baseball season, recording two at bats but no hits. He never played defense for the Dodgers. 

Though having never recorded a major league hit, his autograph is one of the rarest among former athletes and is highly sought after by collectors. Items signed by Smyres consistently fetch incredibly high prices at auction.

Smyres was buried at Forest Lawn Memorial Park, Los Angeles.

References

External links

1922 births
Brooklyn Dodgers players
Baseball players from California
Sportspeople from Los Angeles County, California
2007 deaths
Idaho Falls Russets players
Trenton Packers players
Newport News Dodgers players
New Orleans Pelicans (baseball) players